Pluck or plucking may refer to:

Removal 
 Plucking (hair removal), the removal of hair, fur, or feathers
 Feather-plucking, a behavior in birds
 Plucking post, as used by birds of prey to dismember their prey
 Plucking (glaciation), a process related to glaciers

Music 
 Plucking, the action of playing a plucked string instrument
 Pizzicato, a method of playing string instruments
 "P.L.U.C.K." (song), by System of a Down

Places 

 Pluck, Texas, a community in the United States
 Pluck, County Donegal, community served by Pluck railway station

Other uses 
 Pluck or offal, the internal organs of livestock
 One of two U.S. Navy ships named USS Pluck
 Pluck (company), an Internet company acquired by Demand Media
 PLUCK, an RMITV television series
 Pluck (magazine), British story paper running from 1894 to 1916 under Amalgamated Press
 Lee Pluck (born 1982), footballer

See also 
 Plucky (disambiguation)